Håkan Lars Elias Eriksson (born January 24, 1956) is a retired Swedish ice hockey player. Eriksson began playing hockey in Bjurfors IF but was acquired by Skellefteå AIK in 1974. He became Swedish champions with Skellefteå in 1978, and was a part of Sweden's 1979 World Championship team that won bronze. During the following season he was also part of Sweden's Olympic team in the 1980 Winter Olympics. After four seasons with Skellefteå, Eriksson moved to Stockholm and Djurgårdens IF. He won his second Swedish championship in 1983 with Djurgården. He was the team captain for two seasons, from 1982 to 1984, when he finished his career in Djurgården. During his final season in Djurgården he was again part of Sweden's Olympic team in the 1984 Winter Olympics. He became assistant coach in the same team along with Lars-Fredrik Nyström for the rest of the 1985–86 season when Gunnar Svensson was fired on January 21, 1986. He ended his playing career in 1987 after two seasons in IFK Lidingö.

Career statistics

Regular season and playoffs

International

References

External links
 

1956 births
Living people
Djurgårdens IF Hockey players
Ice hockey players at the 1980 Winter Olympics
Ice hockey players at the 1984 Winter Olympics
Medalists at the 1984 Winter Olympics
Olympic bronze medalists for Sweden
Olympic ice hockey players of Sweden
Olympic medalists in ice hockey
People from Skellefteå Municipality
Skellefteå AIK players
Swedish ice hockey coaches
Swedish ice hockey centres
Medalists at the 1980 Winter Olympics
Sportspeople from Västerbotten County